A traffic count is a count of vehicular or pedestrian traffic, which is conducted along a particular road, path, or intersection. A traffic count is commonly undertaken either automatically (with the installation of a temporary or permanent electronic traffic recording device), or manually by observers who visually count and record traffic on a hand-held electronic device or tally sheet. Traffic counts can be used by local councils to identify which routes are used most, and to either improve that road or provide an alternative if there is an excessive amount of traffic. Also, some geography fieldwork involves a traffic count. Traffic counts provide the source data used to calculate the Annual Average Daily Traffic (AADT), which is the common indicator used to represent traffic volume.  Traffic counts are useful for comparing two or more roads, and can also be used alongside other methods to find out where the central business district (CBD) of a settlement is located. Traffic counts that include speeds are used in speed limit enforcement efforts, highlighting peak speeding periods to optimise speed camera use and educational efforts.

Counting methods 

To permanently or temporarily monitor the usage of a road, an electronic traffic counter can be installed or placed to measure road usage continuously or for a short period of time. Most modern equipment called ATR's (Automatic Traffic Recorders) store count and/or classification data recorded in memory in a timestamp or interval fashion that can be downloaded and viewed in software or via a count display on some equipment. In some instances people either draw up a table and/or use a tally to keep a record of vehicles which pass manually as an alternative to ATR's.

Traffic counter devices

A traffic counter is a device, often electronic in nature, used to count, classify, and/or measure the speed of vehicular traffic passing along a given roadway. The device is usually deployed in near proximity to the roadway and uses an on-road medium, such as pneumatic road tubes laid across the roadway, piezo-electric sensors embedded in the roadway, inductive loops cut into the roadway, or a combination of these to detect the passing vehicles. Pneumatic road tubes are generally used for temporary studies to study a sample of traffic, while piezo-electric sensors and inductive loops are used for permanent studies which can ascertain seasonal traffic trends and are often used in congestion monitoring on major roads. One of the first traffic counting units, called traffic recorders, was introduced in 1937, operated off a strip laid across the street, and used a six volt battery. Each hour it printed off a paper strip with the total for that hour. A newer type of temporary sensor consists of a metal detector and data recorder in a single package, adhered to the pavement in the center of a driving lane, unlike the pneumatic tube detector which cannot differentiate between lanes. 

Recently, off-road technologies have been developed. These devices generally use some sort of transmitted energy such as radar waves or infrared beams to detect vehicles passing over the roadway. These methods are generally employed where vehicle speeds and volume are required without classification which require on-road sensors. Other off-road technologies are video image detection systems. A portable digital camera unit can be mounted to a pole and computer vision software is used to analyze traffic pattern including traffic counts.

Bicycle and pedestrian traffic counting devices 

Technologies for counting bicycles on roads, or bicycles and pedestrians along sidewalks or shared-use paths have progressed with the increased emphasis on the economic, environmental and social benefits of multi-modal traffic networks.  Non-motorized modes of traffic are often surveyed using the same types of sensors used for motorized vehicles; in some cases tuned to be more sensitive to actuation (e.g. Pneumatic tubes, Piezoelectric, inductive loop detectors, Passive and Active Infrared, Video, Magnetometers, et al.).

In 2004, the American private-sector firm Alta Planning and Design, in partnership with the Institute of Transportation Engineers (ITE) initiated the National Bicycle and Pedestrian Documentation Program (NBPD) as an effort to promote greater data collection for non-motorized transportation modes, establish a consistent model for data collection, and address the lack of data access and shared research.

In 2013, the US Department of Transportation, Federal Highway Administration (FHWA) expanded and created a chapter on non-motorized counting for the Traffic Monitoring Guide (TMG) designed to guide planning agencies in the collection of their data.

See also

 People counter
 Passenger Car Unit

References 

Road traffic management
Transportation planning
Road transport
Counting instruments